Wayne Clifford (born 1944) is a Canadian poet and academic.

Early life and education 
Clifford was born in 1944 in Toronto, Ontario. He earned a Bachelor of Arts degree from the University of Toronto in 1967, where he was the co-winner of the E. J. Pratt Prize, shared with Michael Ondaatje. He then earned a Master of Fine Arts from the International Writing Program at the University of Iowa in 1969.

Career 
Clifford began writing poetry when he was fourteen. His first collection, Man in a Window (1965), was the first volume published by Canadian literary publisher, Coach House Press. At the Iowa Writers' Workshop, Clifford worked with Harry Duncan of Cummington Press, and founded Living Series, which published work by colleagues as broadsheets and chapbooks (Michael Lally and Ray DiPalma, among others). Although he was invited as a delegate to the founding conference of the League of Canadian Poets, and helped organize the Kingston's Writers' Association, the Kingston branch of Canadian Artists' Representation, and The Monday Night Boys, Clifford has never allied himself with a school, group or faction. His work demonstrates this independence, moving between elegant, dense and often highly musical freer compositions to an unfashionable but exquisitely made formalism. Clifford has published in a broad range of journals, from The Canadian Forum, Queen's Quarterly and ARC to avant-garde magazines like bill bisset's Blewointment, bpNichol's ganglia, and Sheila Watson's Pelican.

Personal life 
In 2004, Clifford left teaching to write full-time. He presently lives on the island of Grand Manan in the Bay of Fundy.

Bibliography

Man in a Window. Toronto: Coach House, 1965.
Eighteen. Toronto: Coach House, 1966.
Alphabook. Kingston, ON: MakeWork, 1972.
Glass.Passages. Ottawa, ON: Oberon, 1976.
An Ache in the Ear. Toronto, ON: Coach House, 1979.
On Abducting the 'Cello. Erin, ON: Porcupine's Quill, 2004.
The Book of Were. Erin, ON: Porcupine's Quill, 2006.
The Exile's Papers: The Duplicity of Autobiography, Part One. Erin, ON: Porcupine's Quill, 2007.
The Exile's Papers: The Face as its Thousand Ships, Part Two. Erin, ON: Porcupine's Quill, 2009.
Jane Again. Emeryville, ON: Biblioasis, 2009.
Learning to Dance with a Peg Leg.  Victoria, BC:  Frog Hollow Press, 2009.
The Exile's Papers: The Dirt's Passion Is Flesh Sorrow, Part Three.  Erin, ON: Porcupine's Quill, 2011.
b.p. Nichol & Wayne Clifford, Theseus:  A Collaboration.  Toronto, ON:  BookThug, 2014.
The Exile's Papers:  Just Beneath Your Skin, The Dark Begins, Part Four.  Erin, ON, Porcupine's Quill, 2016.

References 

1944 births
20th-century Canadian poets
20th-century Canadian male writers
Canadian male poets
21st-century Canadian poets
Living people
People from Grand Manan
Writers from New Brunswick
21st-century Canadian male writers